Dilan Patricio Zúñiga Espinoza (born 26 July 1996) is a Chilean footballer that currently plays for Primera División club Palestino as a left back.

Honours

Club
Colo-Colo
 Torneo Clausura (1): 2014

References

External links
 
 Zúñiga at Football-Lineups

1996 births
Living people
Footballers from Santiago
Chilean footballers
Chilean expatriate footballers
Association football fullbacks
Colo-Colo B footballers
Colo-Colo footballers
Everton de Viña del Mar footballers
Club León footballers
Coquimbo Unido footballers
Segunda División Profesional de Chile players
Chilean Primera División players
Liga MX players
Expatriate footballers in Mexico
Chilean expatriate sportspeople in Mexico